DeWayne Jessie (a.k.a.  "Otis Day"; born September 21, 1951) is an American character actor best known for his portrayal of Otis Day in National Lampoon's Animal House. In the movie, the songs "Shama Lama Ding Dong" and "Shout" were sung by Lloyd G. Williams and lip-synched by Jessie.

In the 1980s, Jessie purchased the rights to the band name Otis Day and The Knights from Universal Studios and formed a real-life version of the band with some members of his family and toured the country for years afterward, with Jessie assuming the identity of Otis Day. The group released a concert video, Otis My Man, in 1987 and recorded an album, produced by George Clinton, that came out in 1989 titled Shout which flopped. It included updated versions of "Shout" and "Shama Lama Ding Dong" sung by Jessie.

Jessie and the rest of the band members were initiated as honorary members of Tau Kappa Epsilon fraternity at the University of Central Oklahoma in 1985. He lives with three of his grandchildren.

Filmography

External links 
 [ Allmusic - Otis Day And The Knights]
 

1951 births
Living people
American male film actors
African-American male actors
21st-century African-American people
20th-century African-American people